Cristian Brolli (born 28 February 1992) is a San Marino international footballer who plays as a defender.

International career
Brolli has played eight games for the San Marino under-21 side, all of which ended in defeat. He has previously represented the San Marino under-19's, and scored an own goal for Italy in a Euro 2010 (under-19) qualification game at the Stadio Olimpico on 15 November 2009; the team managed to keep a clean sheet until 71 minutes, at which point Brolli's own goal led to a 4–0 loss.

Brolli made his senior debut from the bench on 14 August 2012, in a 3–2 home defeat to Malta. He made his first start on 11 September 2012, in a 6–0 home loss to Montenegro in qualification for the 2014 FIFA World Cup.

In San Marino's home Euro qualifier against England, Brolli scored an own goal as the Three Lions won 6–0.

He scored another own goal for his country against Belgium on 10 October, 2019. Belgium won the game with 9–0.

Brolli then again for the third time scored an own goal, this time in a friendly game against Latvia on 11 November, 2020. The Sammarinese side were defeated by 3–0.

On 9 October 2021, he scored his fourth own goal in a 0–5 defeat against Poland at the Stadion Narodowy in Warsaw.

References

External links
 
 

1992 births
Living people
Sammarinese footballers
San Marino international footballers
San Marino under-21 international footballers
San Marino youth international footballers
Association football defenders
A.S.D. Victor San Marino players
Campionato Sammarinese di Calcio players